Central Panay Mountain Range is the longest and largest mountain range in the island of Panay and Western Visayas in the Philippines. Mount Madja-as is the highest point with an elevation of 6,946 feet (2,117 metres) above sea level. It is famous for its diverse flora and fauna, mossy forest, pristine river's, Waterfalls and clusters of Rice Terraces. Located through the western Panay, from vicinity of Ibajay, Aklan to the north to Anini-y, Antique southern tip to the south. Occupied almost the entire province of the eastern portions of Antique, western Iloilo, western Capiz and western Aklan.

Geography
Central Panay Mountain Range is the largest and longest in the Western Visayas. It is home of the island highest peaks and source of all largest rivers on Panay Island, including the longest, Panay River, .

The range is famous for its diverse range of flora and fauna, as well for the Antique Rice Terraces clusters, the largest and oldest in the Visayas.

Topography

List of highest peaks in Central Panay Mountain Range by elevation.
Mount Madja-as  6,946 ft (2,117 m)
Mount Nangtud  6,804 ft (2,074 m)
E.B.J Peak   6,512 ft (1,985 m)
Mount Baloy  6,424 ft (1,958 m)
Mount Balabag  5,630 ft (1,716 m)
Mount Madi-ac  5,630 ft (1,716 m)
Mount Dumara  5,446 ft (1,660 m)
Mount Agbalanti  5,187 ft (1,581 m)
Mount Nausang 5,138 ft (1,566 m)
Mount Bucayan  5,085 ft (1,550 m)
Mount Kigas  4,974 ft (1,516 m)
Mount Igbanig  4,813 ft (1,467 m)
Mount Sipanag  4,757 ft (1,450 m)
Mount Inaman  4,580 ft (1,396 m)
Mount Tiguran  4,524 ft (1,379 m)
Mount Igdalig  4,521 ft (1,378 m)
Mount Dalagsaan  4,474 ft (1,364 m)
Mount Tigatay  4,436 ft (1,352 m)
Mount Tiran  4,341 ft (1,323 m)
Mount Napulac  4,213 ft (1,284 m)
Mount Sansanan  4,209 ft (1,283 m)
Mount Tiglayo  4,075 ft (1,242 m)
Mount Lingguhob  3,960 ft (1,207 m)
Mount Bantolinao  3,960 ft (1,207 m)
Mount Napulak  3,940 ft (1,201 m)
Mount Tibtib  3,921 ft (1,195 m)
Mount Tambara  3,914 ft (1,193 m)
Mount Ticbayot 3,750 ft (1,143 m)
Mount Sonogong 3,648 ft (1,112 m)
Mount Upao  3,593 ft (1,095 m)
Mount Patag  3,543 ft (1,080 m)
Mount Anoy  3,507 ft (1,069 m)
Mount Usigan  3,497 ft (1,066 m)
Mount Congcong  3,432 ft (1,046 m)
Mount Matarawis  3,379 ft (1,030 m)
Mount Balabag, AK  3,360 ft (1,024 m)
Mount Tuyas  3,343 ft (1,019 m)
Mount Angas  3,274 ft (998 m)
Mount Acotay  3,241 ft (988 m)
Mount Palaypay  3,238 ft (987 m)
Mount Igabon  3,228 ft (984 m)
Mount Toctocan  3,130 ft (954 m)
Mount Tarayan  3,084 ft (940 m)
Mount Tulajon  3,022 ft (921 m)
Mount Tinayunga  3,002 ft (915 m)
Mount Amantara  2,904 ft (885 m)
Mount Tarawis  2,887 ft (880 m)
Mount Tuno 2,841 ft (866 m)
Mount Tigancal  2,825 ft (861 m)
Mount Ontahil  2,789 ft (850 m)
Mount Mingan  2,756 ft (840 m)
Mount Igsabu  2,690 ft (820 m)
Mount Agdulasan  2,687 ft (819 m)
Mount Mayos  2,680 ft (817 m)
Mount Bilbigan  2,615 ft (797 m)
Mount Agta  2,592 ft (790 m)
Mount Dalyang  2,592 ft (790 m)
Mount Tigbararing  2,582 ft (787 m)
Mount Katugpan  2,559 ft (780 m)
Mount Pola  2,530 ft (771 m)
Mount Tigdagano  2,513 ft (766 m)
Mount Cadayo 2,484 ft (757 m)
Mount Tagbagan  2,480 ft (756 m)
Mount Aningalan  2,470 ft (753 m)
Mount Punong  2,428 ft (740 m)
Mount Talapanan  2,428 ft (740 m)
Mount Manlagbo  2,421 ft (738 m)
Mount Igmatongtong  2,362 ft (720 m)
Mount Maasim  2,336 ft (712 m)
Mount Igkobe  2,329 ft (710 m)
Mount Iguiaua 2,320 ft (707 m)
Mount Igguiwig  2,300 ft (701 m)
Mount Bonbon  2,231 ft (680 m)
Mount Dimoros  2,218 ft (676 m)
Mount Igtiring  2,198 ft (670 m) 
Mount Tigmaola  2,057 ft (627 m)
Mount Bangtong  2,037 ft (621 m)
Mount Lanas  2,034 ft (620 m)
Mount Malondong  1,962 ft (598 m)
Mount Banderahan  1,936 ft (590 m)
Mount Igdu-ao  1,929 ft (588 m)
Mount Intigban  1,896 ft (578 m)
Mount Caguman 1,873 ft (571 m)
Mount Igcoron  1,870 ft (570 m) 
Mount Dangulao  1,841 ft (561 m)
Mount Pasguala  1,834 ft (559 m)
Mount Taratara 1,755 ft (535 m)
Mount Eupre  1,673 ft (510 m)
Mount Yabangan  1,631 ft (497 m)
Mount Pauican 1,503 ft (458 m)
Mount Patindog  1,410 ft (430 m)
Mount Mangarang 1,352 ft (412 m)
Mount Palulian  1,325 ft (404 m)
Mount Patindog II  1,050 ft (320 m)
Mount Binangbang  1,050 ft (320 m)
Mount Dumangsal  787 ft (240 m)

River Systems 
List of Rivers in Central Panay Mountain Range by length.
 Panay River, Capiz - 169 km
 Jalaur River, Iloilo - 141 km
 Aklan River, Aklan - 97 km
Mambusao River, Capiz - 77.3 km
 Sibalom River, Antique - 73 km
Tigum River, Iloilo - 71.5 km
Suage River, Iloilo - 64 km
Badbaran River, Capiz - 63.4 km
Laglag River, Iloilo - 62 km
Ma-ayon River, Capiz - 58.9 km
Paliwan River, Antique - 58.2 km
Cangaranan River, Antique - 57.4 km
Aganan River, Iloilo - 56 km
Sibalom River, Iloilo - 48.7 km
Guimbal River, Iloilo - 44.5 km
Ibajay River, Aklan - 43.6 km
Timbaban River, Aklan - 42.7 km
Dalanas River, Antique - 34.6 km
 Tipulu-an River, Antique - 33.1 km
Dumarayray River, Aklan - 32.6 km
Cairawan River, Antique - 31.5 km
Maninila River, Antique - 31.1 km
Tangyan River, Iloilo - 30.5 km
Patnongon River, Antique - 29.2 km
Tapaz River, Capiz - 27.1 km
Tangalan River, Aklan - 27 km
Siuaragan River, Iloilo - 26.5 km
Tibiao River, Antique - 26.4 km
Mali-ao River, Antique - 26.3 km 
Cadi-an River, Antique - 25 km
Lawigan River, Iloilo 24.3 km
Cata-an River, Iloilo 23.4 km
Tiolas River, Iloilo - 20.3 km
Cabay-ang River, Antique - 19.5 km
Tumagbok River, Iloilo - 19.5 km
Paningayan River, LA, Antique - 18.7 km
Malandog River, Antique - 17.8 km
Oyungan River, Iloilo - 16.9 km
 Iloilo River, Iloilo - 16.2 km
Kigas River, Antique - 16.2 km
Bacong River, Antique - 16.1 km
Bayunan River, Iloilo - 16 km
 Mao-it River, Antique - 15.8 km
Baloy River, Antique - 15.4 km
Carit-an River, Antique - 15.1 km
Hamtic River, Antique - 14.8 km
Casay River, Antique - 14.3 km
Bucayan River, Antique - 14.1 km
Guinsang-an River, Antique - 13.8 km
Iba River, Antique - 13.1 km
Naulid River, Antique - 12.7 km
Cansilayan River, Antique - 12.5 km
Bulanao River, Antique - 12.3 km
Aras-Asan River, Antique - 11.5 km
Inyawan River, Antique - 11.4 km
Bugasong River, Antique - 11.4 km
Mamara River, Antique - 11.3 km
Unidos River, Aklan - 10.6 km
Panganta River, Antique - 10.4 km
Paningayan River, CU, Antique - 10.4 km
Binangbang River, Antique - 10.4 km
 Bugang River, Antique - 10.3 km
Baluon River, Antique - 10.1 km
Bajay River, Antique - 10 km
Abiera River, Antique - 8.7 km
Dao River, Antique - 8.6 km
Igpasungaw River, Antique - 8.2 km
Memero River, Antique - 6.2 km
Nalusdan River, Antique - 5.8 km
Aguila River, Antique - 5.5 km
Bitadnon River, Antique - 5.4 km
Nalupa River, Antique - 5.3 km
Igbarawan River, Antique - 5.2 km
Laua-an River, Antique - 4.6 km

Waterfalls 
List of waterfalls in Central Panay Mountain Range:

Tarugan Falls, Igbaras
Nasuraan Falls, Libacao
Tigmalmos Falls, Tibiao
Lagsacan Falls, Igbaras
Nadsadjan Falls, Igbaras
Kamalasag Falls, Sebaste 
Guiritsan Falls, Igbaras 
Miagos Falls, Igbaras 
Sigbungon Falls, Barbaza 
Igpasungaw Falls, Sebaste 
Bulwang Falls, Sebaste Antique
Bolinao Falls, Valderrama Antique
Pangitanan Falls, Libertad Antique
Bugtong Bato Falls, Tibiao
Macalbag Falls, Barbaza
Bugsukan Falls, Tubungan Iloilo
Tarayan Falls Laua-an Antique
Nawidwid Falls Ibajay Aklan
Mount Madjaas Waterfalls Culasi AQ.
Ring Falls Panipiason, Madalag Aklan
Sayay Falls, Barbaza 
 Cadiao Falls, Barbaza 
Igcalaya Falls Lambunao Iloilo
Ayo Falls Igcabugao, Igbaras Iloilo
Libug Falls Mount Madjaas Culasi
Agtuhangin Falls Madalag Aklan
Apok-Apok Falls San Remigio Ant.
Nabaya Falls Bugasong Antique
Pangilatan Falls, Tapaz, Capiz 
Bato Sumpit Falls, Tubungan, Iloilo
Kiput Falls, Bgy. Passi, Igbaras Iloilo 
Imoy Falls, Bucari, Leon, Iloilo
Iglangit Falls San Remigio Antique
Capnayan Falls Laua-an Antique
Binokot Falls Tapaz Capiz
Abakaan Falls Buri, Tapaz Capiz
Kataw Falls Simbola, Culasi, Antique
Pula Falls, San Remigio, Antique
Kawa-kawa Falls, Valderrama Ant.
Pisak Falls, Pandan Antique
Panakayan Falls, Bugasong Antique
Halat Falls, Igsoro, Bugasong Antique
Kurudyanan Falls Igsoro, Bugasong
Madangga Falls, Panipiason Madalag
 Yapo Falls, Barbaza

Aningwan Falls, Tubungan

Natural Parks, Lakes and Rice Terraces 

Sibalom Natural Park, Sibalom Antique
Aklan River Watershed Forest Reserve
Aningalan Highlands  San Remigio, Antique
Bucari Pine Forest Leon Iloilo
 Mount Napulak, Igbaras Iloilo
Tinagong Dagat, Lambunao Iloilo
Gen. Fullon Rice Terraces San Remigio
Tinagong Dagat, Miag-ao, Iloilo
Sinundolan Rice Terraces San Remigio
Laua-an Rice Terraces Laua-an Ant.
Bato Dungok Peak Alimodian Iloilo
Tibiao Rice Terraces, Tono, Tibiao
Bakiang Rice Terraces, Valderrama
San Agustin Rice Terraces, Valderrama, Antique
Lake Danao, San Remigio Antique
Lublub Rice Terraces, Valderrama, Antique
 Mayabay Rice Terraces, Barbaza

Caves 

Central Panay Mountain Range List of Caves.

Igbaclag Cave, San Remigio Antique
Kulapnitan Cave, Igbaras Iloilo
Matong Cave, Bgy.Passi, Igbaras, Iloilo
Bais Cave, Bgy. Passi, Igbaras, Iloilo
Igcabugao Cave, Igbaras, Iloilo
Canyogan Cave, San Remigio Antique

Gallery

References

Mountain ranges of the Philippines
Landforms of Antique (province)
Landforms of Iloilo
Landforms of Aklan
Landforms of Capiz